Rosebraugh is a surname. Notable people with the surname include: 

Craig Rosebraugh (born 1972), American writer, filmmaker, and animal rights activist
Eli Rosebraugh (1875–1930), American baseball player
Keri Rosebraugh, American artist and art administrator